Narre Warren South College is a school in Narre Warren South, Victoria, Australia. Narre Warren South P-12 College commenced operations in 2002 but was not officially opened until 2007. The prep to twelve college actually began as a prep to year seven school in 2002 and it was not until 2007 (when it was officially opened) that the college went to year 12.

The college is broken up into two sections, primary years (prep to grade 6), secondary years (7-12). Each sub-school has a coordinator and a leader's council that deals with the day-to-day workings of each year.

As well as VCE, the school is also a strong endorsee of VCAL and provides that option for all students entering year 12.  The college is recognized for its outstanding VCE results, having attained median VCE study scores of 33 in 2020, and 32 in the years previously.  It has also won 30 VCAL State Achievement Awards. In 2016, the college placed second in the state in the Junior Division of Battle of the Bands. Since 2017, the college has been recognized as a DET "Influence" school because of its consistently outstanding performance. In 2018, the college was awarded the Lindsay Thompson Fellowship at the Victorian Education Excellence Awards, and in 2019 was recognized by The Age newspaper as the top Government School in Southern Melbourne.

Principals
2002–2008 - Ross Miller
2008–2014 - Rob Casamento
2015–2020 - Rob Duncan
2021–present - Peter Thatcher

Layout
The school comprises seven main buildings:

A-block - Administration, sickbay, library, Year 7 office and classrooms [Classrooms are hard to locate at first as a new student because of the layout of each classroom. These classrooms in A-block tend to stink because there are no windows in some of the classrooms so there is no fresh air.]
B-block - Food technology, visual art, media, drama, music (Also includes Performing Arts Centre)
C-block - Later years (Years 10–12) classrooms and Later years reception.
D-block - Science, technology, engineering, digital technology, Year 10 locker bay.
E-block - School gym including weights room for year 9-12 students, Year 7-9 reception, year 7 and 8 locker bay, primary performing arts.
F-block - Years 8-9 offices and classrooms, year 9 locker bay.
G-block - Grades prep-6 classroom and reception.

See also
Education in Australia
List of high schools in Victoria

External links
 Narre Warren South P-12 College Extranet
 https://www.theage.com.au/national/victoria/schools-that-excel-how-the-southern-stars-shine-20200405-p54h8l.html
 https://www.education.vic.gov.au/school/teachers/classrooms/Pages/celebratingveea2018.aspx

Public high schools in Melbourne
Public primary schools in Melbourne
2002 establishments in Australia
Educational institutions established in 2002
Buildings and structures in the City of Casey